Alfred Jacomis (9 July 1910 – 17 June 2004) was a French cross-country skier. He competed in the men's 18 kilometre event at the 1936 Winter Olympics.

References

1910 births
2004 deaths
French male cross-country skiers
Olympic cross-country skiers of France
Cross-country skiers at the 1936 Winter Olympics
Sportspeople from Cantal